Paata Iradionovich Berishvili (born 30 September 1973) is a Russian professional football coach and a former player. He also holds Georgian citizenship.

Playing career
He made his debut in the Russian Premier League in 1992 for FC Dynamo Stavropol.

References

1973 births
Living people
People from Racha-Lechkhumi and Kvemo Svaneti
Russian footballers
FC Dynamo Stavropol players
FC Anzhi Makhachkala players
FC Kuban Krasnodar players
FC Fakel Voronezh players
FC Elista players
FC Sokol Saratov players
FC Taraz players
Russian Premier League players
Russian expatriate footballers
Expatriate footballers in Ukraine
Expatriate footballers in Kazakhstan
Expatriate sportspeople from Georgia (country) in Ukraine
Expatriate sportspeople from Georgia (country) in Kazakhstan
Russian expatriate sportspeople in Ukraine
Russian expatriate sportspeople in Kazakhstan
Russian football managers
FC Dynamo Stavropol managers
Association football midfielders
FC Mashuk-KMV Pyatigorsk players
FC Spartak Nizhny Novgorod players